Agona may refer to:

Towns
Agona, Sekyere South District, Ghana
Agona Swedru,  Agona West Municipal District, Ghana
Agona Nkwanta, Ahanta West District, Afigya kwabere
Agona East District, in the Central Region of Ghana
Agona West Municipal District, in the Central Region of Ghana